The 1962 Idaho lieutenant gubernatorial election was held on November 6, 1962. Democratic incumbent W. E. Drevlow  defeated Republican nominee Kenneth Arnold with 54% of the vote.

Primary elections
Primary elections were held on June 5, 1962.

Democratic primary

Republican primary

General election

References

Idaho
Lieutenant